Sweetwater Creek may refer to:
 Sweetwater Creek (novel), a novel by Anne Rivers Siddons
 Sweetwater Creek, Florida, an unincorporated community in Hillsborough County, Florida
 Sweetwater Creek (Chattahoochee River), Georgia
 Sweetwater Creek State Park, in Douglas County, Georgia
 Sweetwater Creek (Echeconnee Creek tributary), Georgia
 Sweetwater Creek (Flint River tributary), Georgia
 Sweetwater Creek (Logan Creek), a stream in Missouri
 Sweetwater Creek (Comanche County, Texas)
 Sweetwater Creek (Gray County, Texas)
 Sweetwater Creek (Nolan County, Texas), namesake of Sweetwater, Texas
 Sweetwater Creek (Tennessee River), tributary to the Tennessee River at Loudon, Tennessee
 Sweetwater Creek in Frankston, Victoria, Australia

See also
 Sweetwater (disambiguation)
 Sweetwater River (disambiguation)